Anisoptera reticulata is a tree in the family Dipterocarpaceae. The specific epithet reticulata means "netted", referring to the leaf veins.

Description
It has buttresses. The bark is fissured and flaky.

Distribution and habitat
Anisoptera reticulata is endemic to Borneo.

Conservation
Anisoptera reticulata has been assessed as endangered on the IUCN Red List. It is threatened by agricultural plantations and by logging for its timber. The species is found in some protected areas.

References

reticulata
Endemic flora of Borneo
Plants described in 1967
Taxonomy articles created by Polbot
Flora of the Borneo lowland rain forests